Kaada Beladingalu is a Kannada language film released in 2007 and directed by B. S. Lingadevaru. The movie is about the impact of urbanization on the old people living in the rural areas. The film was shot in the interior villages of Chikmagalur district.

Cast 
 Lokanath as Sadashivaiah
 H. G. Dattatreya as Chandranna
 Ananya Kasaravalli as Sudeshne
 M. P. Venkat Rao as Shankranna

Awards 
Karnataka State Film Awards 2006-07
 Karnataka State Film Award for Best Social film
 Karnataka State Film Award for Best Story

54th National Film Awards
 National Film Award for Best Feature Film in Kannada

References

External links

2007 films
2000s Kannada-language films
Best Kannada Feature Film National Film Award winners
Films directed by B. S. Lingadevaru